The Embassy may refer to:

 The Embassy (band), a Swedish music group
 The Embassy (professional wrestling), a professional wrestling faction in Ring of Honor
 World Professional Darts Championship, a championship previously referred to as The Embassy
 The Embassy Lark, a radio comedy series broadcast from 1966 to 1968 as a spin-off from The Navy Lark
 The Embassy Visual Effects, a visual effects studio located in Vancouver, Canada
 The Embassy (TV series), a 2014 Australian factual television series

See also 
 Embassy (disambiguation)